Galaxy Airlines Flight 203 was a Lockheed L-188 Electra 4-engine turboprop, registration N5532, operating as a non-scheduled charter flight from Reno, Nevada to Minneapolis/St Paul, which crashed on January 21, 1985, shortly after takeoff. All but one of the 71 on board died.

Accident

The flight, which was returning from a gambling and Super Bowl trip sponsored by Caesars Tahoe, took off from runway 16R at Reno-Cannon International Airport (now Reno-Tahoe International Airport) at 1:04 am on January 21, 1985. Heavy vibration started shortly after takeoff, and the pilots asked the tower for permission to make a left downwind turn, saying they needed to land. Debris was scattered across US Highway 395 and South Virginia Street; a store and several vehicles on the ground were damaged. Of the 71 people aboard, three initially survived. One died on January 29 and another on February 4. The sole survivor was a 17-year-old boy who was thrown clear of the aircraft and landed upright, conscious and still in his seat, on South Virginia Street.

Because of the large number of victims, the bodies were taken to the Reno Livestock Events Center, and four local medical students assisted the local coroner in performing autopsies.

Investigation

The National Transportation Safety Board concluded that the probable cause of the accident was

The NTSB found that ground handlers did not properly close the air start access door due to an interruption in their procedures: when a supervisor realized that the headset used for communication with the flight crew was not working, he switched to using hand signals mid-routine. In the confusion the supervisor signaled the flight to taxi before the air start hose had been disconnected. After the supervisor realized his error and signaled the flight crew to make an emergency stop, the hose was successfully disconnected but the air start access door was not closed.

The report concluded that the open access door caused vibrations which distracted the pilots, though they would likely not have prevented the aircraft from reaching cruise speed and altitudethere had been reports from other Electra pilots that the vibrations ceased at higher air speeds. The pilots reduced power to all four engines simultaneously, presumably to see whether they were the source of the vibrations, and did not restore power quickly enough to prevent a stall.

Aftermath
A memorial called Galaxy Grove was dedicated at Rancho San Rafael in 1986. After the plaque was stolen in 2013, a two-ton granite replacement was installed.

See also
List of sole survivors of airline accidents or incidents

References

External links
Plane Crashes Since 1970 with a Sole Survivor at airsafe.com.

Aviation accidents and incidents in the United States in 1985
January 1985 events in the United States
Airliner accidents and incidents caused by pilot error
Accidents and incidents involving the Lockheed L-188 Electra
Galaxy Airlines Flight 203
Galaxy Airlines (United States) accidents and incidents
History of Reno, Nevada
1985 in Nevada
Reno–Tahoe International Airport